Bel Canto is an opera by Peruvian composer Jimmy López. Based on the 2001 novel of the same name by Ann Patchett, the work uses a libretto by Pulitzer Prize-winning playwright Nilo Cruz. The libretto is sung in Spanish, English, Japanese, Russian, German, French, Latin, Italian, and Quechua. It was commissioned by the Lyric Opera of Chicago as part of the Renée Fleming initiative. Sir Andrew Davis conducted, and director Kevin Newbury staged the work. The cast included Danielle de Niese as Roxane Coss, J’Nai Bridges as Carmen, Jeongcheol Cha as Hosokawa, and Andrew Stenson as Gen.

Performance history

Pre-production
The opera underwent several revisions and rewrites as a result of numerous work sessions between composer Jimmy López, librettist Nilo Cruz, director Kevin Newbury, conductor Sir Andrew Davis, and creative consultant Renée Fleming. A workshop took place on July 8–11, 2014 where four out of a total of six scenes were rehearsed with members of The Patrick G. and Shirley W. Ryan Opera Center. A select group of donors and members of the press were invited to attend the last day of the workshop on July 11, 2014. The creative team (this time with soprano Danielle de Niese, bass-baritone Jeongcheol Cha, and pianist Adam Nielsen) met for a final work session and workshop on December 7–9, 2014 at Opera America's National Opera Center. The tech rehearsals took place on the week of July 20, 2015 and the Lyric Opera Chorus began rehearsals in late July under the supervision of chorus master Michael Black.

World premiere
Bel Canto premiered in Chicago on December 7, 2015 at the Ardis Krainik Theatre of the Civic Opera House, home to the Lyric Opera of Chicago. Since its announcement on February 28, 2012 Bel Canto garnered increasing attention, and it became one of the most awaited world premieres of the 2015–2016 season. It was performed seven times: December 7, 10 and 12, 2015 and January 5, 8, 13 and 17, 2016.  The sixth performance was filmed by PBS for a later airing in 2016.

Roles

Instrumentation
The work is scored for 3 flutes (2nd and 3rd doubling piccolo), 3 oboes (3rd doubling english horn), 3 clarinets in B-flat (2nd doubling clarinet in E-flat and 3rd doubling bass clarinet), 3 bassoons (3rd doubling contrabassoon), 4 horns in F, 3 trumpets in B-flat and C (2nd doubling pututu in E-flat & A-flat and 3rd doubling piccolo trumpet in A), 3 trombones, tuba, timpani, 3 percussion instrument players, piano (on stage), harp, and strings.

Staging
Director Kevin Newbury led the following group of designers who were in charge of bringing Bel Canto to the stage: set designer David Korins, costume designer Constance Hoffman, lighting designer Duane Schuler, and projection designer Greg Emetaz.

References

External links
Jimmy López's website
Nilo Cruz's page at IMDB
Kevin Newbury's website
Sir Andrew Davis' website
Danielle de Niese's website
Renée Fleming's website
Lyric Opera of Chicago's website
Bel Canto: A World Premiere is Born (video)
Going backstage with Lyric Opera's 'Bel Canto' composer - Chicago Tribune

Operas
2015 operas
Multiple-language operas
Opera world premieres at the Lyric Opera of Chicago
Operas based on novels
Operas set in Peru